Spectrin alpha chain, erythrocyte is a protein that in humans is encoded by the SPTA1 gene.

Spectrin is an actin crosslinking and molecular scaffold protein that links the plasma membrane to the actin cytoskeleton, and functions in the determination of cell shape, arrangement of transmembrane proteins, and organization of organelles. It is a tetramer made up of alpha-beta dimers linked in a head-to-head arrangement. This gene is one member of a family of alpha-spectrin genes. The encoded protein is primarily composed of 22 spectrin repeats which are involved in dimer formation. It forms weaker tetramer interactions than non-erythrocytic alpha spectrin, which may increase the plasma membrane elasticity and deformability of red blood cells. Mutations in this gene result in a variety of hereditary red blood cell disorders, including elliptocytosis type 2, pyropoikilocytosis, and spherocytic hemolytic anemia.

Interactions
Spectrin, alpha 1 has been shown to interact with Abl gene.

References

Further reading

EF-hand-containing proteins